Exeter Racecourse is a thoroughbred horse racing venue located near the city of Exeter, Devon, England. Locally it is known as Haldon racecourse because of its location on top of the Haldon Hills. Until the early 1990s it was officially known as Devon and Exeter.

On 1 November 2005 racehorse Best Mate died at the course of a suspected heart attack whilst competing in the William Hill Haldon Gold Cup.

History

Horse racing has been part of Exeter's heritage since the middle of the 17th century, one of many racecourses created due to Charles II's love of the sport, and there have been claims that the racecourse is one of the oldest in the country. Horse racing rules were standardised after the Jockey Club was formed in 1750. A race was written about by Louisa Graves in 1819, and there were records of meetings at the course in 1804, probably earlier.

The course was popular during the early 19th century, attracting entries from all over the country. By 1850, the popularity of National Hunt racing had waned and William White's gazetteer claimed that it was "little used". It popularity increased again over the following years, although there was a pause in racing during World War II. The course has been known variously as Haldon racecourse by locals due to its location, Devon and Exeter until the 1990s and more recently Exeter Racecourse.

Duel
The last duel in Devon occurred at the racecourse in 1833, when Peter Hennis, a doctor, and Sir John Jeffcott, a judge, drew pistols over Hennis spreading gossip. Hennis was wounded in the exchange, and died the following week; Jeffcott fled to Sierra Leone.

Stand

The new stand was made of steel but with an iron roof, and held a bar, a weigh-room and other facilities as well as storage space.

By 2006, Exeter Racecourse included three stands, Haldon, Anstey and Brockman. The Haldon stand was opened by Anne, Princess Royal in 2004 and caters for the premier ticket holders, while the Anstey stand was opened by Lord Woodrow Wyatt in 1986. Upstairs in the Haldon stand, there is a gallery with seating to watch the races, and a bar named after Best Mate, as well as the Desert Orchid restaurant. For non-premier ticket holders, there is the Romany King bar, and burger van.

Location

The course is at the top of the Haldon Hills, near Exeter. The original course was described as a "fine oval course of two miles", though in the 1850s an additional flat course was added, one mile long, making the total course length three miles. By the 1940s, the steeplechase matched the line of the original course. One lap of the course includes eleven fences, two of which are open ditches and one a water jump.

Notable races

The course has historically had a Gold Cup race, which was won in 1807 by Lord Charles Somerset's horse, Bagatelle, sire of Sir Peter Teazle. There have also been special races in the 1810s to focus on three-year-old thoroughbreds foaled in the West Country. Presently the best known race is the Haldon Gold Cup, held in November. In 2005 the three-time winner of the Cheltenham Gold Cup, Best Mate, collapsed and died of a suspected heart attack after its jockey pulled up during the race.

Charity races at the course have included jockeys riding Clydesdale horses in aid of Devon Air Ambulance in 2013, and Dartmoor ponies in aid of Cancer Research UK in 2014.

Caravan Site
During the summer the Caravan and Motorhome club run a caravan site in the grounds of the racecourse.

References

External links 
 
 Exeter Racecourse in Little Blue Pen

 
Horse racing venues in England
Sports venues in Devon
Sport in Exeter